Cyclops (Kyklōps) is an ancient Greek satyr play by Euripides, based closely on an episode from the Odyssey. It would have been the fourth part of a tetralogy presented by Euripides in a dramatic festival in 5th Century BC Athens. The date of its composition is unknown, but it was probably written late in Euripides' career. It is the only complete satyr play extant. It is one of a double bill in the 2022 Cambridge Greek Play.

Plot

The play is set in Sicily at Mount Aetna. Silenus explains that he and his sons, the chorus, are slaves to the Cyclops Polyphemus. The chorus enter with singing and sheep. Silenus tells them to stop singing and send the sheep into the cave because he can see a Greek ship by the coast and men coming to the cave. 

Odysseus enters with his men and asks where they can find water and if anyone will sell them food. Silenus questions Odysseus and Odysseus questions Silenus. On learning that he will probably be eaten if found, Odysseus is keen to leave. Silenus is keen to swap the Cyclops' food for Odysseus' wine. Silenus exits into the cave while the chorus talk to Odysseus. Silenus reenters with much food. 

The Cyclops enters and wants to know what is going on. Silenus explains that Odysseus and his men have beaten him and are taking the Cyclops' things and have threatened the Cyclops with violence. The Cyclops decides to eat them. Odysseus says that Silenus is lying, but the Cyclops believes Silenus. Odysseus tries to persuade the Cyclops not to eat them. The Cyclops is not persuaded. All but the chorus exit into the cave. The chorus sing until Odysseus enters from the cave and tells the chorus that the Cyclops has eaten some of his men and that he has been giving the Cyclops wine and that he intends to blind the Cyclops and save everyone, including the satyrs. The chorus are keen to help. 

The Cyclops exits from the cave singing and drunk and wanting more wine from Odysseus. The Cyclops wants to go and share with his brothers but is persuaded to stay. Silenus and the Cyclops drink wine until the Cyclops decides to take the now very appealing Silenus to bed, and the pair exit into the cave. The chorus affirm that they are ready to help Odysseus, but urge him to go in and help Silenus. Odysseus calls on Hephaestus and Hypnos then exits into the cave. The chorus sing. 

Odysseus enters from the cave and tells them to be quiet and come and help burn the eye out. The chorus excuse themselves. Odysseus suggests that they can at least offer encouragement. They agree to provide this and do provide this while Odysseus exits into the cave. The Cyclops enters from the cave with noise and blindness. The chorus mock him and direct him away from Odysseus and the others while they escape from the cave. Odysseus addresses the Cyclops before exiting toward his ship. The Cyclops says that he is going to smash the ship then exits into the cave, which is "pierced through" (ἀμφιτρῆτος). The chorus say that they will go with Odysseus and be slaves to Dionysus.

Analysis
Euripides is not the only ancient dramatist who wrote a Cyclops satyr play. Aristias of the early fifth century did also. But Cyclops is apparently the only thing which Euripides wrote with a particular Homeric foundation. Euripides' play combines the myth of Dionysus's capture by pirates with the episode in Homer's Odyssey of Odysseus' time with the cyclops Polyphemus. Into this scenario Euripides thrust Silenus and the satyrs, comic characters. 

 The satyr play as a medium was generally understood as a "tragedy at play". It relied extensively on the multifarious connotations which surrounded the concepts of "playfulness (paidia), education (paideia), child (pais), slave (pais), playful (paidikos), and childishness (paidia)". In Cyclops Euripides employed "metapoetically loaded terms" like second and double and new to highlight interactions with his sources, familiar and foundational texts in Athenian education. The characters in Cyclops are not ignorant of Euripides' sources. "Silenus 'knows his Odyssey rather well'". Euripides' Cyclops knows about the Trojan War and gives Odysseus his opinion of it. By playing with metapoetic images throughout the play Euripides fostered "a collective consciousness" in his democratic audience and facilitated their recognition that cooperation was necessary throughout Athens if they were to overcome their enemies.

Both the Homeric episode and Euripides' Cyclops are based on the blinding of the Cyclops. It was almost certainly known by Euripides' audience that a particular Alcander had stuck a stick into the eye of Lycurgus the Spartan lawgiver. On one level of Euripides' play Alcibiades thrusts a stake into the eye of "a gross caricature of a Spartan", expressing "a shift of political alliances ostensibly achieved by Alcibiades". Like Sophocles' Philoctetes, Euripides' Cyclops made an appeal on behalf of Alcibiades that he be allowed to return from exile. Euripides also encouraged his audience to consider the recent Athenian enterprise against Sicily, which was undertaken for greed against an intractable and difficult enemy when Athens could barely provide money or men and which did not go well.

The Homeric Polyphemus is brutish and alien to Odysseus and his crew. Euripides' Polyphemus is sophisticated and intellectually analogous to sophists of the fifth century. The influence of the Sophists is manifest throughout Euripides' plays "not only in his rhetorical style but also in his skeptical, down‐to‐earth approach". In Cyclops both Odysseus and the Cyclops employ deft and appropriative rhetorical manipulation, "aggressive sophistry that reduces men to meat, and fine talk to deceptive barter". 

Gluttonous ingestion is a theme and "[t]he imagery of grotesque ingestion surfaces almost immediately in the play". Euripides' Cyclops has been described as "a figure of proto-Rabelaisian excess" and linked to ideas contained in the work of Mikhail Bakhtin.  Polyphemus "likes to talk, he likes to eat, [...] to talk about eating, or to try to eat those who talk to him". The Cyclops and the satyrs continually refer to the Cyclops' belly and the satisfaction thereof. Interaction between Odysseus and the Cyclops is based on food and exchange.

In the play the Cyclops suggests that people are the source of morality and not the gods. He says that he sacrifices only to his belly, the greatest of divinities. Such impiety was of substantial interest to Athenians in the fifth century. Euripides often dealt with "the consequences of impiety". One facet of Greek religion was "to honor and placate the gods because they are powerful". The Athenians judicially punished philosophers and sophists. Euripides himself may have left Athens in "self-imposed exile". But in his play his Cyclops is punished for impiety by having his eye burned out. In Euripides' plays, "Characters might refuse to worship certain gods, blaspheme them, or even at times question the morality of the gods, but there is little evidence of what we would call atheism, a complete lack of belief in any god, in Greek thought".

The location of the cyclopes in the Odyssey is not specified, but Euripides' Cyclops is set in Sicily, possibly following Epicharmus, portrayed as barbarous and desolate and hostile. This was not an accurate representation of Sicily. But the point is that the place is "completely non-Bacchic" and "non-Dionysiac". This is mentioned by every character in the play. 

In Cyclops Polyphemus has captured and enslaved Silenus and a group of satyrs. The satyrs play an important role in driving the plot without any of them actually being the lead role, which, in the satyr play generally, was always reserved for a god or tragic hero (in this case Odysseus). According to Carl A. Shaw, the chorus of satyrs in a satyr play were "always trying to get a laugh with their animalistic, playfully rowdy, and, above all, sexual behavior." Satyrs were widely seen as mischief-makers who routinely played tricks on people and interfered with their personal property. They had insatiable sexual appetites and often sought to seduce or ravish both nymphs and mortal women alike (though not always successfully). A single elderly satyr named Silenus was believed to have been the tutor of Dionysus on Mount Nysa. After Dionysus grew to maturity, Silenus became one of his most devout followers and was perpetually drunk. The identity of satyrs is plastic and somewhat elusive, but a salient aspect in Cyclops is the "comic inversion of societal norms". They were overall "creatures that were funny and joyful, pleasing and delightful, feminine and masculine, but also cowardly and disgusting, pitiful and lamentable, terrifying and horrific". Satyrs were revered as semi-divine beings and companions of the god Dionysus. They were thought to possess their own kind of wisdom that was useful to humans if they could be convinced to share it. 

In Cyclops the chorus "claim to know an incantation of Orpheus that will bring down a form of fiery destruction upon their enemy". When the satyrs identify the Cyclops as a "son of Earth" and present their firebrand as igniting the Cyclops' skull rather than his eye they mimic a traditional Orphic incantation and Zeus's punishment of the Titans, the "sons of Earth" and primordial enemies of the Orphic Dionysus. The central focus of Orphism is the suffering and death of the god Dionysus at the hands of the Titans, which forms the basis of Orphism's central myth. In the play the satyrs are devotees of Dionysus and on the island of Sicily, known to be "a center of Orphic cult".  

Cyclops has been both lauded and scorned, with hostile commentators criticising its simplicity of plot and characterisation. There is little agreement. According to critics the play is derived entirely from the Homeric episode or mostly from the Homeric episode, is an interrogator of Homeric and tragic portrayals, or "a rival version of a Homeric episode with new contemporary implications."

Translations
 Percy Bysshe Shelley, 1819 (published 1824) – verse (full text at Google Books or )
 Edward P. Coleridge, 1891 – prose (full text from MIT Classics)
 Arthur S. Way, 1912 – verse
 J. T. Sheppard, 1923 – verse
 William Arrowsmith, 1956 - verse
 Roger Lancelyn Green, 1957 – verse
 David Kovacs, 1994 – prose (full text on Tufts Perseus)
 Heather McHugh and David Konstan, 2001 – verse
 George Theodoridis, 2008 – prose (full text at Bacchicstage Wordpress)
 Patrick O'Sullivan and Christopher Collard, 2013 (full text on Academia.edu)

See also

 Ancient Greek literature
 Ancient Greek religion
 Classical Greece
 Dionysia
 Dionysian Mysteries
 Music of ancient Greece
 Theatre of ancient Greece

References

Plays by Euripides
Odysseus
Sicilian characters in Greek mythology
Satyr plays
Plays set in ancient Greece
Plays set in Sicily
Works based on the Odyssey
Plays based on works by Homer
Silenus